RAF wings may refer to:

The aircrew badge worn by pilots and other aircrew.  See Aviator_badge#Royal_Air_Force.
The formations formed of several squadrons which are either part of a group or a station.  See List of wings of the Royal Air Force.